Chris Barnes (born February 25, 1970) is an American professional bowler and member of the Professional Bowlers Association (PBA), who currently competes on both the PBA Tour and PBA50 Tour. He has also competed internationally as a member of Team USA.

Barnes, a right-handed bowler, has been one of the leading professionals on the tour. He has won 19 PBA Tour titles and over $2.4 million (U.S.) in total prize money during his 20-year career. He has earned at least $100,000 in 14 PBA seasons, including 12 consecutive seasons (1999 through 2010–11). He won the PBA Rookie of the Year Award in 1998 and earned PBA Player of the Year honors in the 2007–08 season. At the time, this made him only the third bowler in PBA history to win both Rookie of the Year and Player of the Year honors in a career, after Mike Aulby and Tommy Jones. Jason Belmonte and E. J. Tackett have since joined that group.  Barnes is one of only eight players in PBA history to earn a career "triple crown" (accomplished by winning the U.S. Open, PBA World Championship and PBA Tournament of Champions). On October 18, 2017, the PBA announced that Barnes had been voted into the PBA Hall of Fame; he was inducted with the 2018 class.

To date, Barnes has rolled 55 perfect 300 games in PBA competition, including the 22nd nationally televised 300 game. He has also won four PBA50 titles and 28 PBA Regional Tour titles.

Barnes is a pro staffer for 900 Global, Vise Grips and 3G shoes.

Personal life

Chris has been married to Lynda Barnes ( Norry) since 1999. Lynda is an accomplished professional bowler in her own right who has represented the United States in international competition as a longtime member of Team USA, and currently bowls for Senior Team USA. She is also a two-time winner of the USBC Queens and won the 2008 USBC Clash of the Champions tournament.

The Barnes family lives in Denton, Texas. The Barnes' twin sons, Troy and Ryan, were born in May, 2002. Ryan currently bowls for his father's alma mater, Wichita State University.

Career achievements

Amateur career
Barnes attended Topeka High School, and then bowled collegiately at Wichita State University, where he earned a Bachelor of Arts degree in Business Management. He is a 16-time member of Team USA (1994–1998 and 2008–2018), and has also captained the US team in the Weber Cup.

PBA and World Bowling Tours

Barnes currently owns 19 career PBA Tour titles, placing him 16th all-time. His titles include the 62nd U.S. Open, the 2006 Dexter Tournament of Champions and the 2011 PBA World Championship.  Winning these three majors makes him just one of nine PBA players to have earned a career "triple crown." He had won at least one title in eight consecutive seasons, before being shut out in the 2009–10 season despite four TV Finals appearances. Barnes only needs a USBC Masters title to complete a career "grand slam."  He has qualified as the #1 seed in the Masters three times, but has yet to win it. Barnes also owns 28 PBA Regional titles through 2018.

In the 2004–05 season, Barnes posted career highs in average (226.69) and earnings ($194,300) while winning his first major title at the 2005 U.S. Open. He also won the first two PBA Motel 6 Roll to Riches tournaments in 2005 and 2006, which included a winner-take-all grand prize of $200,000.  At the time, these were the two largest prize checks in the history of televised bowling, but the earnings do not count toward PBA totals. The 2006 tournament was held in Lewisville, Texas, a mere eight miles from his residence. In 2007, Barnes narrowly missed having an opportunity for a three-peat at the event. His first chance to earn a spot in the event would have been by winning a major title. He made the TV finals for the 2007 World Championship and Tournament of Champions, but he did not win either. He also could have earned a spot on the show as the World Point Rankings leader, but he finished second behind Wes Malott. And lastly, he could have made it as one of the top two vote getters in an online fan poll, held on www.pba.com.  But Barnes finished third, behind legends Walter Ray Williams Jr. and Norm Duke.

Barnes was the fastest player to reach $1,000,000 in career earnings, reaching that mark in 220 events, easily eclipsing the previous record of 253 events held by Pete Weber and Jason Couch. This record has since been bested by Australian Jason Belmonte, who reached the $1,000,000 earnings mark in only 131 events.  Barnes eclipsed the $1.5 million mark in total PBA tour earnings during the 2007–08 season.  He was ranked #26 on the PBA's 2008 list of "50 Greatest Players of the last 50 years."

Barnes along with his wife participated in the 2008 and 2009 USBC Clash of Champions, a special televised event on CBS. Lynda won the event in 2008, defeating Sean Rash by a 258–237 score in the championship match. The following year, it was Chris who advanced to the championship finals, winning the tournament over Rebekah Diers, 257–207. He and Lynda are the only two players to win the USBC Clash of Champions.

Barnes bowled the PBA's 22nd-ever televised 300 game in a semifinal match of the 2011 GEICO Shark Open at the PBA World Series of Bowling (broadcast March 4, 2012).

Barnes won the 2014 QubicaAMF World Cup, and he achieved a televised 300 game in the semifinals before defeating Germany's Tobias Börding
in the two-game final, 269–248 and 231–216. He would roll another 300 game in the semifinals of the 2015 DHC PBA Japan Invitational, which was broadcast live on Japanese television as well as on the PBA's Xtra Frame webcast service. Barnes won a 5 million Yen ($43,032 USD) bonus for the 300 game in that tournament, in addition to the 5 million Yen he also won for winning the tournament itself.

On September 30, 2015, Barnes announced he would undergo surgery to repair a herniated disc in his back, forcing him to withdraw from the PBA Fall Classic in Las Vegas, NV, and putting his participation in the December 2015 PBA World Series of Bowling in doubt. The surgery is the same procedure that was done to Dallas Cowboys quarterback Tony Romo, and was performed by the same doctor.

On November 20, 2018, Barnes was voted by his peers to receive the PBA Tony Reyes Community Service Award. Since 2005, Chris and wife Lynda have hosted an annual Barnes Thanksgiving Classic youth scholarship tournament in the Dallas area.

PBA50 Tour
Barnes joined the PBA50 Tour (for players 50 years and older) in 2020, but the season was cancelled due to the COVID-19 pandemic. In his fourth event of the 2021 season on June 30, Barnes won his first PBA50 Tour title at the PBA50 Cup major in Lubbock, Texas. 

Barnes captured three PBA50 titles in 2022, at the Granville Financial Open in Aberdeen, North Carolina, David Small's Championship Lanes Open in Anderson, Indiana, and David Small's JAX60 Open in Jackson, Michigan.

Hall of Fame
On October 18, 2017, the PBA announced that Barnes had been voted into the PBA Hall of Fame. He was officially inducted on February 17, 2018, as part of the PBA's 60th Anniversary festivities in Indianapolis.

PBA titles

PBA Tour
Major championships are in bold text.

 1999 Flagship Open (Erie, Pennsylvania)
 1999 PBA Oregon Open (Portland, Oregon)
 2001 PBA Greater Nashville Open (Hendersonville, Tennessee)
 2003 Days Inn Open (Dallas, Texas)
 2003 Oranamin C Japan Cup (Tokyo, Japan)
 2005 62nd U.S. Open (North Brunswick, New Jersey)
 2006 Dexter Tournament of Champions (Uncasville, Connecticut)
 2007 GEICO Classic (Irving, Texas)
 2008 Bayer Classic (El Paso, Texas)
 2008 Don Johnson Buckeye State Classic (Columbus, Ohio)
 2009 Don Johnson Buckeye State Eliminator Championship (Columbus, Ohio)
 2009 Go RVing Match Play Championship (Norwich, Connecticut)
 2010 PBA World Championship (Las Vegas, Nevada)
 2012 Columbia 300 Vienna Open (Vienna, Austria)
 2013 Lucas Oil PBA Milwaukee Open (Milwaukee, Wisconsin)
 2013 WSOB Viper Championship (Las Vegas, Nevada)
 2014 Emir Cup (Doha, Qatar)
 2015 DHC Japan Invitational (Tokyo, Japan)
 2018 PBA Xtra Frame Lubbock Sports Open (Lubbock, Texas)

PBA50 Tour
 2021 PBA50 Cup (Lubbock, Texas)
 2022 PBA50 Granville Financial Open (Aberdeen, North Carolina)
 2022 PBA50 David Small's Championship Lanes Open (Anderson, Indiana)
 2022 PBA50 David Small's JAX60 Open (Jackson, Michigan)

Difficulties in televised finals
Barnes has often struggled in the live televised finals of many tournaments.  His 19 titles have come in 87 championship round appearances, and he has finished runner-up 25 times. In the 2000 season alone, he made 12 TV finals without winning a title—to date the most season TV finals appearances without a victory in PBA Tour history.

On two occasions, Barnes has lost a match in a PBA major by a single pin:

 In January 2008, he faced Michael Haugen Jr. in the finals of the PBA Tournament of Champions in Las Vegas.  Through six frames, Barnes held a 53-pin lead over his competitor, and seemed to have the match well in hand.  Up by 41 pins in the ninth, Barnes left the 10-pin standing on his first throw and narrowly missed his spare. Haugen, who had strikes in his previous two frames, struck in the ninth to cut the lead to 19. Haugen went on to throw two strikes and 9 pins in the final frame, forcing Barnes to throw two strikes and one pin in the last frame to win. He left the 2-pin and spared in the tenth, and needed a strike on his final throw to force a roll-off. This time he left the 4-pin standing to give Haugen his first career major victory, 215–214.
 In April 2009, Barnes qualified as the #2 seed in the U.S. Open. A title in this tournament would have given him his second straight Player of the Year award.  In the semifinal match against Mike Scroggins, Barnes needed a strike on the first ball and six pins on the second ball in the 10th frame to move on to the title match.  On what appeared to be a clean pocket hit, however, he left a single 8-pin standing. After making the spare, he still could have forced a sudden-death roll-off by striking on his final shot.  This time, he left a single 10-pin, giving Scroggins a 200–199 victory.

In January 2010, Barnes was the #1 seed in the finals of the 2010 PBA Tournament of Champions in Las Vegas, but was defeated by Kelly Kulick, 265–195.  Kulick made history in this match by becoming the first woman to win a PBA Tour title.

In February 2010, Barnes again qualified as the #1 seed at the USBC Masters, however he lost to Walter Ray Williams Jr. in the televised championship match 290-217.

In April 2011, Barnes had a chance to win the first-ever Dick Weber PBA Playoffs.  In the final match against Dick Allen, he had a 25-pin lead after five frames before leaving back-to-back 7–10 splits on pocket hits.

Career PBA statistics

Statistics are through the last complete PBA Tour season.

+ Please note: CRA is an abbreviation for Championship Round Appearances.

In the media

During the 2006–07 Denny's PBA Tour season, fellow Denny's PBA Tour bowler Norm Duke took part in the ESPN telecasts for events in which he failed to reach the TV Finals. Along with Dave Ryan and Randy Pedersen, he served as a second color commentator. However, during events in which Duke made the TV Finals, Barnes filled in as the third commentator. In the 2011–12 season, Barnes has been the third commentator for several World Series of Bowling finals events, joining Pedersen and Rob Stone. He also served as a laneside reporter for the 2019 PBA Tour Finals on CBS Sports Network.

Barnes is also an official Sport bowling spokesperson for the United States Bowling Congress (USBC).

A League of Ordinary Gentlemen
Barnes is featured in the 2006 documentary A League of Ordinary Gentlemen, along with PBA Tour stars Pete Weber and Walter Ray Williams Jr., and 20-time PBA Tour titlist Wayne Webb. The film follows the four bowlers as they take part in the 2002–03 PBA Tour season.

World Bowling accomplishments
In addition to his PBA accomplishments, Chris also won the World Tenpin Masters tournament in 2006 and was a semi-finalist in 2007 (losing to eventual tournament winner, Jason Belmonte of Australia).  In 2008, he made the finals of the World Tenpin Masters, but lost to Guy Caminsky of South Africa.  At the end of the 2007–08 season, he was ranked second in the PBA World Point rankings to Walter Ray Williams Jr.

Barnes won four gold medals at the American Zone Championships in Costa Rica in 1997.  He represented the USA at the WTBA Championships in Bangkok, Thailand in 2008.  Chris was also chosen (along with female pro Stefanie Nation) to represent Team USA at the 2009 World Games, which took place in Kaohsiung, Taiwan in July, 2009.

In the 2009 Pan American Bowling Confederation (PABCON) Championships, Barnes helped Team USA gain a sweep of all six medals with his gold medal in the Masters singles event.

Barnes captained Team USA in its 2019 Weber Cup win over Team Europe. He participated in 12 of the 32 matches, going 5–2 in singles, and 1–2 in doubles, and 1–1 in team.

Skills Challenge
Barnes is one of the top skill shot bowlers on the tour today. He has made the "Flying Eagle" more than anyone, but perhaps his greatest skills shot is his ability to bowl with his opposite hand, his left hand. PBA commentator Randy Pedersen jokingly stated that Barnes could be "borderline ambidextrous" on a Skills Challenge telecast, after Barnes threw a left-handed strike with the ball rolling under a chair placed on the lane.

His skills paid off in the 2005 Miller High Life Skills Challenge, when he defeated Parker Bohn III for the $20,000 top prize. In the 2006 PBA Skills Challenge, Barnes lost to eventual champion Norm Duke in the semifinals. For the 2006–07 Denny's PBA Tour season, bowlers competed in pairs. Barnes teamed up with 13-time tour titlist Del Ballard Jr. They were defeated in the opening round by Wes Malott and Chris Johnson.

Professional putting
Prior to his bowling career, Barnes was a member of the Professional Putters Association, where he played professional Putt-Putt tournaments. In 1989, Barnes made his first television appearance earning $7,000 in the Putt-Putt SKINS game.

References

External links
 Industry profile of Chris Barnes
 Chris Barnes Q&A on PBA.com
 Chris Barnes clips
 Story and picture about Chris Barnes winning the 2006 World Tenpin Masters

American ten-pin bowling players
Wichita State Shockers athletes
Bowling broadcasters
Bowlers at the 2011 Pan American Games
1970 births
Living people
Pan American Games medalists in bowling
Pan American Games gold medalists for the United States
Pan American Games silver medalists for the United States
Medalists at the 2011 Pan American Games